London Christian High, LCH or London Christian is a Christian private secondary school in London, Ontario. LCH was formed in 1965, and is governed by a membership-elected Board. It is a member of the Ontario Alliance of Christian Schools, and follows the Province of Ontario education curriculum. LCH is a member school of the Thames Valley Regional Athletic Association and of WOSSAA as well as OFSAA. LCH  is categorized as an "A" school. The principal is Gabriella Hoogstra.

London Christian High was formerly known as LDCSS, or London District Christian Secondary School. The school rebranded to London Christian High in 2018 as the previous name was quite difficult to say.

The school is also notoriously known for their mascot 'The LCH Pioneer' which makes them a great team to cheer for in sports events.

References

Christian schools in Canada
Educational institutions established in 1968
High schools in London, Ontario
Private schools in Ontario